Gabriel & Dresden is the debut studio album by American electronic music duo Gabriel & Dresden. The album was released on June 1, 2006, on their record label Organized Nature. The album contains the singles "Tracking Treasure Down" which features Molly Bancroft and "Dangerous Power" which features Jan Burton.

The cover art resembles the cover of Steely Dan's 2000 album Two Against Nature.

Production
It is Gabriel & Dresden's first and last self-titled artist album, on their new label Organized Nature. The duo is usually seen remixing songs from rock, pop and alternative bands but Dave Dresden and Josh Gabriel decided to build their own work with Apple's Logic Pro software and music sequencer Ableton Live. In February 2005, Gabriel and Dresden collected their equipment: a Minimoog Voyager, Roland TR-909, guitars, bass and odd instruments like a German log drum and metal bell plates played with mallets to build up their pop-rock-structured dance tracks. They used plug-ins and samples as their synthesizer along the Logic Pro.

Instrumental
Eleven, an instrumental track which includes the participation of Scarlett Etienne featured oscillating synth sounds and bass layers of the Voyager, string sounds were created by delaying, distorting and phasing the bass making it sound harmonically but it is an automating pitch shifter. Then the sound was set in through reverb, tremolo, and a NorthPole filter; This creates an uncluttered clear space in the track. Drums are an integral part of their mixes, Gabriel and Dresden tend to layer snares more than kicks. They adapt a high end kick in one side and a low end kick on the other, but they do not usually layer them because the kicks provide the tones, when layered, the frequencies are interconnecting which causes a beat not a kick. They make arrangements to move the bass rhythm which has no downbeat or fading in or EQ which takes the low end out only when the kick is happening to make a pure kick, just like their song Summer Calling as Andain. The pulsating Moog bass synth in Eleven is fluid, but as soon as the kick hits, the bass fades. In Logic, Gabriel created fade-ins at the quarter note, and with the bass having holes in it when soloed, nothing sounds missing when played alongside the kick. The duo uses bass space wisely to put bass sounds through one bus and put a limiter such as Waves' L2 Ultramaximizer on the track. Gabriel will also compile simple bass sets on a bus and put a multiband compressor through it, to create unity which makes it possible to be controlled with only one synth, another plug-in for bass is the Ohm Force Frohmage. To surround the bass Gabriel makes sure that there is no superfluous low end taking up space in tracks that don't need it, having nothing below 400 Hz. Their second single from the album was Mass Repeat which included Eleven as a B-side, Darryl  Smyers of the Dallas Observer described the single as "a clever comment on the entire genre", he also stated that both are "engaging and expressive mixes of movement and mind".

Vocals
The album features two lead vocalists, Molly Bancroft and Jan Burton, as well as backup vocals from Dave, Josh, Gabriel's wife, Kristy; and their little son, Rowan. The vocals also set in onslaught; this can make a background vocal chopped, reversed, reverbed, delayed, phased and distorted. The sound is made by Gabriel and Dresden with a Studio Projects tube microphone through a Grace 101 preamp into a Summit Audio TLA-50 compressor as well as in a MOTU 828mkII interface. Some vocal songs like "Let Go" featuring Molly Bancroft and "Enemy" with Burton prove how Gabriel and Dresden's methodology of creating an obvious lead vocal into separated, secondary layers. The background vocals provide a midpoint between high and low due to the sibilance; the highest part of the voice is the thing that gives one intelligibility, the high end is what makes the words clear since there is nothing clearer than one voice; everything else is blurrier once it is added. A song that meets these criteria is "Tracking Treasure Down", which features one clear voice and the additional background vocals at a certain high end pulled down so high frequencies don't interfere with the lead voice. By taking away the high end it would become muddier, which is something Dave evaded; he took all high-end voices away, except for one, which peaks through and creates a definite position of all minor vocals. The layer comes from the pitch part of the voice and not the sibilance, which eliminates most high end and low end voices making it sound in layers. Leaving several vocals with all the high end in position overloads the sound for the ears. By taking all ends off it hurts the ears; in this situation they used a shelf, so it would pull 5 dB less from 5,600 Hz, making it sound like if the vocals lose edge, as if it were falling behind, which does not remove the bass. Dresden uses a high-pass filter at 1,100 Hz which lies in-between. Rocktronica singer and songwriter Jes Brieden helped with the writing of lyrics for songs like "Enemy" and "Dangerous Power". Tracks "Enemy" and "Dangerous Power" are adaptations from the track "Imagination" by the duo's group Motorcycle with Jes Brieden. "Dust in the Wind" is a cover of the band Kansas; alternatively the duo wanted to cover "Black Hole Sun" by Soundgarden but they decided for "Dust in the Wind" since Dave felt it was a tribute to 9/11.

Transitions
Gabriel and Dresden have both been known as deejays for years, when they mixed Gabriel & Dresden, they felt the pressure to make it come across like a mix CD, but also tried not to be mistaken for a mix CD. They mixed the songs together with beatless transitions. Laying out the tracks back-to-back in Ableton Live which forms quick seamless transitions between tracks in the overall 124 to 135 bpm range. The automation features in Ableton Live made the transitions easy to accomplish during the in-between parts with tempo set, volume and filter fades into action. The length of sounds were stretched to fit the music and create a complete chord changes at the 11th hour creating perfect segues. Josh Gabriel has a tendency of using 37 million effects on one track, but  is rarely one of them. His philosophy on why he holds back on panning is because it is an effect. He only panned the vocals and textures or pads to make it feel spacious. Tracking Treasure Down is an example of how panning was used during the production, on the background vocals to make the chorus sound interesting and sound like different people were talking, both voices were panned differently.

Track listing

Credits
This list contains information credited to the artwork designers, engineers, photographers and producers.
 Artwork design by - Dave Dresden, Josh Gabriel and Mark Oliver Skinner
 Engineered and mixed by - Josh Gabriel
 Mastered by - Kris Solem
 Photography - William Henshall
 Producer - Gabriel & Dresden

Personnel
This list contains information of the personnel who created the vocals, song writings and guests that participated in the production of each song from the album.

"Let Go"
 Acoustic guitar - David Penner
 Additional backing vocals - Kristy Gabriel
 Electric bass - Josh Gabriel
 Electric guitar - Molly Bancroft
 Lead vocals - Molly Bancroft
 Six-flat Bell plate bells - Josh Gabriel
 Written by - Dave Dresden, David Penner, Josh Gabriel and Molly Bancroft

"Eleven"
 Written by - Dave Dresden, Josh Gabriel and Scarlett Etienne

"Enemy"
 Additional backing vocals - Leonie Burton
 Additional writing by - N. Davenport
 Backing vocals - Jan Burton
 Lead vocals - Jan Burton
 Written by - Dave Dresden, Josh Gabriel, Jan Burton and Jes Brieden

"Dust in the Wind"
 Lead vocals - Molly Bancroft
 Log drum percussion - Josh Gabriel
 Written by - Kerry Livgren

"Mass Repeat"
 Additional drums - Pete Houser
 Written by - Dave Dresden and Josh Gabriel

"Closer"
 Backing vocals - Josh Gabriel and Kristy Gabriel
 Electric bass - Molly Bancroft
 Electric guitar - Molly Bancroft
 Written by - Josh Gabriel, David Penner and Mavie Marcos

"Not Enough"
 Backing vocals - Jan Burton
 Lead vocals - Jan Burton
 Written by - Dave Dresden, Josh Gabriel and Jan Burton

"Amsterdam Interlude"
 Piano - Josh Gabriel

"New Path"
 Additional writing by - N. Davenport
 Lead vocals - Jan Burton
 Written by - Dave Dresden, Josh Gabriel, Jan burton

"Sydney"
 Written by - Dave Dresden and Josh Gabriel

"Dangerous Power"
 Backing vocals - Dave Dresden
 Electric bass - Josh Gabriel
 Lead vocals - Jan Burton
 Piano - Josh Gabriel
 Written by - Dave Dresden, Josh Gabriel, Jan Burton and Jes Brieden

"Tracking Treasure Down"
 Additional vocals - Rowan Gabriel
 Additional keyboards - Molly Bancroft
 Backing vocals - Dave Dresden and Josh Gabriel
 Handclaps - Josh Gabriel and Molly Bancroft
 Lead vocals - Molly Bancroft
 Written by - Dave Dresden, Josh Gabriel and Molly Bancroft

Release history

References

Sources 
 http://www.discogs.com/release/1121796

2006 albums
2006 remix albums
Gabriel & Dresden albums